The 1968–69 season was Kilmarnock’s 67th in Scottish League Competitions.

Scottish Division One

Scottish League Cup

Group stage

Group 3 final table

Scottish Cup

See also
List of Kilmarnock F.C. seasons

References

External links
https://www.fitbastats.com/kilmarnock/team_results_season.php

Kilmarnock F.C. seasons
Kilmarnock